Český rozhlas (ČRo) is the public radio broadcaster of the Czech Republic operating since 1923. It is the oldest radio broadcaster in continental Europe and the second oldest in Europe after the BBC.

The service broadcasts throughout the Czech Republic nationally and locally. Its four national services are Radiožurnál, Dvojka, Vltava and Plus. Czech Radio operates 12 nationwide stations and another 14 regional stations. All ČRo stations broadcast via internet stream, digital via DAB+ and DVB, and part analog via terrestrial transmitters.

History

Czechoslovak era
, then  was established on 18 May 1923, making its first broadcast from a scout tent in the Kbely district of Prague, under the name Radiojournal. The premises of the station changed numerous times, firstly moving to the district of Hloubětín, before later using locations in the Poštovní nákupny building, the Orbis building and the Národní dům na Vinohradech building, all in Prague.

The first regular announcer of the station, who prepared and presented the news from the daily papers, was Adolf Dobrovolný. He took up the position on 17 January 1924, becoming the station's first professional radio announcer and his position was made permanent on 1 January 1925. He held the position until his death in 1934.

A message broadcast on Czech Radio on 5 May 1945 brought about the start of the Prague uprising. In the same year, regional studios in the cities of Plzeň, České Budějovice, Hradec Králové and Ústí nad Labem were launched.

The station was taken over by Soviet forces, after short fighting with unarmed civilians, in August 1968, in the first day of the Soviet invasion, although broadcasting managed to continue from alternative locations.

Czech era

In 1991, the Czech radio group changed its status and became an independent organisation, although as of 2008 was still publicly funded.

Czech Radio (ČRo) was established by Act of the Czech National Council (No. 484/1991 Coll.) on Czech Radio. On 1 January 1992, Ceský Rozhlas was established as a public radio with property transferred from Czechoslovak Radio. The headquarters were setup at Vinohradská 12 in Prague, where the old Czechoslovak Radio was based at. Operation of regional stations in the Czech Republic was also transferred. On 1 January 1993, Czech Radio became a member of the European Broadcasting Union (EBU). In 1999, Czech Radio launched an experimental digital radio broadcast in Prague.

An envisaged new premises for Czech Radio, a 30-storey building in the district of Pankrác which took 22 years to build at a cost of 1.35 billion Czech koruna, was sold after the construction phrase in 1996 as it was deemed too big for the station's requirements.

In 2002 the Radio Free Europe/Radio Liberty station stopped broadcasting in the Czech Republic, with the broadcast rebranded as Czech Radio 6 under the Czech Radio group.

Czech Radio launched a new logo in 2013, featuring the letter R with stripes, at a cost of 2.2 million Czech koruna.

The organisation marked 90 years of existence in 2013, celebrating the occasion with a 48-hour broadcast including 90 interviews interspersed with news reports every half-hour. The event, which took place on Wenceslas Square, set a new national record for the longest uninterrupted radio broadcast.

Radio stations

Digital stations

Regional stations

Regional stations broadcast daily from 5 a.m. to 7 p.m. (ČRo Brno, Plzeň and Ostrava until 7.30 p.m.) with several breaks. In these breaks, in the evening and at night, the programmes of the Central Bohemian ČRo Region are broadcast nationwide.

Former stations
Broadcast of Radio 6, Leonardo and Radio Cesko all ended in 2013.

See also
 Česká televize, the Czech publicly funded television broadcaster
 Battle for Czech Radio in World War Two

References

Bibliography

External links

 
Official website in English
LyngSat Logo – Czechia – Logos of Český Rozhlas stations

Radio stations in the Czech Republic
European Broadcasting Union members
Publicly funded broadcasters
State media
Mass media companies established in 1923
Radio stations established in 1923